The 1935 Idaho Southern Branch Bengals football team was an American football team that represented the University of Idaho, Southern Branch (later renamed Idaho State University) as an independent during the 1935 college football season. In their first season under head coach Guy Wicks, the team compiled a 7–0–1 record and outscored opponents by a total of 202 to 26.

Schedule

Notes

References

External links
 1936 Wickiup football section — yearbook summary of the 1935 season

Idaho Southern Branch
Idaho State Bengals football seasons
College football undefeated seasons
Idaho Southern Branch Bengals football